Dieffenbachia amoena (dumbcane) is a monocot  which is commonly cultivated as a houseplant, for its decorative leaves. It is a very popular and hardy shade-loving plant. Its leaves are large, oblong, and cream or light yellow with deep green spots and stripes in bands along the veins and border. Like any other Dieffenbachia its sap is poisonous.

Dieffenbachia amoena can be propagated by tip and nodal cuttings. It can attain a height of 6 feet in favourable condition. It likes high humidity and a draft-free atmosphere. It should not be placed in front of an air-conditioner unit or fan. After watering its leaf becomes straight and brittle. So if transportation is required, stop watering for a few days, to prevent the leaves from breaking.

Dieffenbachia amoena is considered an unresolved name by The Plant List.

References

Dieffenbachia Amoena - Dumb Cane - araceae
Canadian Poisonous Plants Information System

amoena
House plants